Zakariye Haji Abdi (born 1958) is the former Somali Minister for Information and Telecommunication, Higher Education & Culture, acting foreign minister and the leader of Alliance for the Re-liberation of Somalia.  He helped organize the May 2000 Somali Peace Conference and later served on the technical committee for the Djibouti Peace process.

Early life
Zakaria was born in Galkacyo, Somalia, in 1958, and  he comes from the Leelkase Tanade, a sub-clan of the Darod clan.

Education
From an early age he attended Dugsi where he would memorize the Qur'an and learn the basic Islamic Principles. He attended an Egyptian elementary school in Galkacyo. The family moved to Mogadishu in 1969, where he attended intermediate and secondary school. He graduated from Riyadh University, faculty of Agriculture, where he obtained a BSc in agricultural engineering. He has an MBA from State University of New York at Albany and an M.Sc. from Middlesex University in London.

Career

Somali Minister 
Zakaria served as a Minister of Information, Minister of Education and acting foreign minister for two consecutive IGAD summit meetings in Khartoum, Sudan, and Kampala, Uganda (2002–2003).
Member of Somali parliament from 2004 to 2007. Also member of Arab Parliament from 2005 to 2007 as member of Foreign Relations and Strategic Security of the Arab World.

Leadership profiles
Zakaria is former minister in several portfolios, member of Somali and Arab Parliaments, former leader and one of the founders of the Alliance for the Re-liberation of Somalia. He was one of the presidential candidates of Somalia in the 2012 presidential election. 
He is currently secretary general of the Council of Somali Political Parties, senior expert consultant at the Ministry of Agriculture of the Federal Republic of Somalia in Food Security and Agri-Business sectors, as well as chairman of Hufan Group of Company in Mogadishu, Somalia.

Personal life
Mr Zakaria is a father and hava children.

References

Living people
1958 births
Somalian politicians
People from Galkayo